The Dr. Joseph Maurer House is a historic house in Washington, Pennsylvania.

It is designated as a historic residential landmark/farmstead by the Washington County History & Landmarks Foundation.

References

External links
[ National Register nomination form]

Houses on the National Register of Historic Places in Pennsylvania
Second Empire architecture in Pennsylvania
Houses completed in 1896
Houses in Washington County, Pennsylvania
Washington, Pennsylvania
National Register of Historic Places in Washington County, Pennsylvania